A heteronym (also known as a heterophone) is a word that has a different pronunciation and meaning from another word but the same spelling. These are homographs that are not homophones. Thus, lead (the metal) and lead (a leash) are heteronyms, but mean (average) and mean (intend) are not, since they are pronounced the same. Heteronym pronunciation may vary in vowel realisation, in stress pattern, or in other ways.

Description 
A heteronym is a homograph that is not a homophone, a word that has a different pronunciation and meaning from another word with the same spelling. Heteronym pronunciation may vary in vowel realisation, in stress pattern, or in other ways.

"Heterophone" literally just means "different sound", and this term is sometimes applied to words that are just pronounced differently, irrespective of their spelling. Such a definition would include virtually every pair of words in the language, so "heterophone" in this sense is normally restricted to instances where there is some particular reason to highlight the different sound. For example, puns normally involve homophones, but in the case of heterophonic (or imperfect) puns, the two words sound different, and yet similar enough for one to suggest the other (for example, mouth and mouse).

Types 
Most heteronyms are doubles. Triple heteronyms are extremely rare in English; three examples, sin, mobile and does, are listed below.

Proper nouns can sometimes be heteronyms. For example, the final syllable in the US state of Oregon is pronounced  (or ), while in the name of the village of Oregon in Wisconsin, the final syllable is pronounced . Other examples include local pronunciations of Cairo, Georgia; Versailles, Kentucky; and Milan, Tennessee—compared to the more well-known Cairo, Versailles, and Milan—or the difference between the pronunciation of Louisville, Kentucky and the town of Louisville, New York.

There are also pairs which ignore case and include both initialisms and regular words, e.g., US and us.

Heteronyms also occur in non-alphabetic languages. For example, 20% of the 2400 most common Chinese characters have multiple readings; e.g., 行 can represent háng '''profession' or xíng 'OK'. In Arabic, vowels are normally not written, leading to ambiguous written words such as <كتب> /ktb/, which can be read /kataba/ 'he wrote', /kutubun/ 'books', or /kutiba/ 'it was written'; it is unclear whether these should be considered heteronyms, since they are unambiguous when fully vocalized. 

 Examples 

 Heteronyms with definitions 

English

In some of these cases, American and British English pronunciations differ.  One systematic case appears in the stress pattern of some deverbal nouns.

For a longer list, see wikt:Category:English heteronyms.

French

In French, most heteronyms result from certain endings being pronounced differently in verbs and nouns. In particular, -ent as a third person plural verb ending is silent while as an adjective ending, it is pronounced .

Modern Greek

Modern Greek spelling is largely unambiguous, but there are a few cases where a word has distinct learned and vernacular meaning and pronunciation, despite having the same root, and where <ia> is pronounced  vs. ;Nick Nicholas, answer to "In modern Greek, are there any two words with different spellings but with exactly the same pronunciation? Also, is there any single spelling which has two different pronunciations?", Quora.com, May 23, 2019 there are also a few cases where the different readings of <> and <> give different words. Some of these distinctions are being neutralized in modern speech.

Italian

Italian spelling is largely unambiguous, althouɡh there are some exceptions:
 stress, which is usually but not always on the penult, is not marked except when it is on the final syllable;
  and  may have a vocalic or a consonantal value.

When stress is on the final, the vowel is written with an accent: mori 'mulberries' and morì 'he/she died'. Some monosyllabic words are also differentiated with an accent: e  'and' and è  'he/she is'. These cases are not heteronyms.

Some common cases:

Dutch

Dutch has heteronyms which vary in stress position, known as klemtoonhomogramen 'stress homograms', such as appel:  'apple' vs.  'appeal' (formerly written appèl). Other examples include beamen, bedelen, hockeyster, kantelen, misdadiger, overweg, verspringen, verwerpen.

The word plant is generally pronounced , but may be pronounced  in the sense 'he/she plans'.

German

German has few heteronyms, for example:
 Some vary in stress position: umfahren 'to knock down' vs. umfahren 'to bypass'; übersetzen 'to translate' vs. 'to traverse'; Spiegelei 'fried egg' vs. 'mirroring'.
 Some are compounded differently: Staubecken as Stau-becken vs. Staub-Ecken or Wachstube as 'Wach-stube' vs. 'Wachs-tube'; etc.
 Several are borrowings: modern 'to molder' (derived from Moder'') vs. 'modern' (borrowed from French) or Montage 'Mondays' vs. 'mounting, installing, assembling' (the latter borrowed from French).

See also 
 Homograph
 Homonym
 Synonym
 Shibboleth

Notes

Types of words
Homonymy